Elections were held in the state of Western Australia on 26 February 2005 to elect all 57 members to the Legislative Assembly and all 34 members to the Legislative Council. The Labor government, led by Premier Geoff Gallop, won a second term in office against the Liberal Party, led by Opposition Leader Colin Barnett.

Results

Legislative Assembly

|}

Notes:
 The Independent member for Pilbara, Larry Graham, and the Independent member for South Perth, Phillip Pendal, both retired at the 2005 election. The seats returned to the Labor and Liberal parties respectively.

Legislative Council

|}

Notes:
 By the time of the 2005 election, the One Nation Party actually held no seats, as the three members elected in 2001 election had resigned to sit as independents, later joining the New Country Party. None managed to retain their seats.

Seats changing hands

 Members listed in italics did not contest their seat at this election.
 *Figure is Labor vs. Liberal

Post-election pendulum

See also
 Members of the Western Australian Legislative Assembly, 2001–2005
 Members of the Western Australian Legislative Assembly, 2005–2008
 Candidates of the 2005 Western Australian state election

References

Elections in Western Australia
2005 elections in Australia
2000s in Western Australia
February 2005 events in Australia